The University of Bandundu (UB) is a public university in the Democratic Republic of the Congo, located in the province of Bandundu, city of Bandundu. At its creation, it was an extension of the University of Kinshasa, then called University Centre of Bandundu (C.U.B.). As of 2012 it had 800 students in six faculties. Instruction is in French.

History
The University was created 1 October 2004 as Bandundu Center University(C.U.B.), extension of the University of Kinshasa, and became autonomous in 2010 following Ministerial order No. 157/MINESU/CABMIN/EBK/PK/2010 27 September 2010.

See also
 City of Bandundu
 Bandundu Province
 List of universities in the Democratic Republic of the Congo

References
 Ministerial Decree No. 157/MINESU/CABMIN/EBK-PK-2010 September 27, 2010, on the empowerment of some extensions of the institutions of higher and university education (article 2 point 8)

Universities in the Democratic Republic of the Congo
Bandundu (city)
Educational institutions established in 2004
2004 establishments in the Democratic Republic of the Congo